Cheikh Touradou Diouf (born 4 May 1956) is a Senegalese sprinter. He competed in the men's 200 metres at the 1980 Summer Olympics.

References

1956 births
Living people
Athletes (track and field) at the 1980 Summer Olympics
Senegalese male sprinters
Olympic athletes of Senegal
Place of birth missing (living people)